José Javier Pomés Ruiz (born 12 March 1952 in Pamplona, Navarra)
was a Spanish politician and
Member of the European Parliament with the People's Party,
Member of the Bureau of the European People's Party and sat on
the European Parliament's Committee on Budgetary Control
and its Committee on Development.

He was a substitute for the Committee on Budgets, substitute for the
Delegation to the EU-Chile Joint Parliamentary Committee.

Education
 Graduate in law, University of Navarre
 Master's degree in economics and business administration, IESE Business School, Barcelona
 Seventeen years' experience in the private financial and business sector
 Former Secretary of UPN, member of the Parliament of Navarre
 held the portfolio for economics and finance in the Government of Navarre

Career

 1977-1979 Compañía Navarra de Autobuses. Director General. Pamplona.
 1979-1982 Confederación Española de Sociedades de Garantía Reciproca. Director General, Madrid.
 1982-1991 Lawyer. Pamplona.
 1991-1993 Regional Minister of Economics, Budget an taxes. Gobierno de Navarra, Pamplona.
 1993-1994 and 1996-2009: Member of the European Parliament

See alsoer: 2004 European Parliament election in Spain

 2009-2011 : General Adviser, Core Team of European Parliament President. Brussels
 2012-2014 : Lawyer and Public Affaires Consultor. London
 2015-today: Lawyer and Public Affaires Consultor. Lisboa.

External links
 
 

1952 births
Living people
University of Navarra alumni
People's Party (Spain) MEPs
MEPs for Spain 1999–2004
MEPs for Spain 2004–2009
MEPs for Spain 1989–1994